is a cover album by the Irish pop group The Nolans. Released on 21 July 1991 exclusively in Japan by Teichiku Records, the album consists of 10 English-language covers of songs made famous by Japanese idol Momoe Yamaguchi.

The album peaked at No. 77 on Oricon's albums chart and sold over 12,000 copies.

Track listing

Charts

See also
 The Nolans Sing Momoe 2005

References

External links
 
 

1991 albums
The Nolans albums
Covers albums
Teichiku Records albums